Francis Thornhill Baring, 1st Baron Northbrook,  (20 April 1796 – 6 September 1866), known as Sir Francis Baring, 3rd Baronet, from 1848 to 1866, was a British Whig politician who served in the governments of Lord Melbourne and Lord John Russell.

Early life
A member of the famous Baring banking family, he was the eldest son of Sir Thomas Baring, 2nd Baronet, and his wife Mary Ursula Sealy, eldest daughter of Charles Sealy.

Baring was educated at Winchester College and then Eton College. He obtained a double first class from Christ Church, Oxford, in 1817, and graduated with a Master of Arts four years later. In 1823, he was called to the Bar at Lincoln's Inn and in 1848, he succeeded his father as baronet.

Political career
Baring entered the British House of Commons in 1826, sitting as a Member of Parliament for Portsmouth until his retirement in 1865. A year later, he was raised to the Peerage of the United Kingdom as Baron Northbrook. Baring was appointed a Lord of the Treasury in 1830, a post he held for the next four years until June 1834. In 1831, Baring was appointed to also serve on the Government Commission upon Emigration, which was wound up in 1832.

He was a Secretary to the Treasury until November 1834, executing this office again between 1835 and 1839. Subsequently, Baring was sworn of the Privy Council and joined the cabinet as Chancellor of the Exchequer, serving until the fall of the Melbourne government in August 1841. He returned to the cabinet in January 1849, replacing Lord Auckland as First Lord of the Admiralty in Russell's cabinet, until its fall in 1852.

Baring was a member of the Canterbury Association. He met John Robert Godley on 24 November 1849 to discuss educational matters for the proposed settlement in Canterbury, New Zealand, and gave £600 for education as a memorial to Charles Buller, who had died in the previous year.

Personal life
Lord Northbrook was twice married.  Firstly, on 7 April 1825 at the Dockyard Chapel, Portsmouth, Lord Northbrook married Jane Grey (1804–1838), daughter of the Sir George Grey, 1st Baronet, and niece of Charles Grey, 2nd Earl Grey. They were the parents of:

 Hon. Mary Baring (d. 1906), who married John Bonham-Carter, son of John Bonham-Carter.
 Thomas George Baring (1826–1904), who married Elizabeth Sturt, daughter of Henry Sturt and sister of Lord Alington.

Secondly, in 1841 he married Lady Arabella Georgina Howard (1809–1884) at St George's, Hanover Square. Lady Arabella was the second daughter of Kenneth Howard, 1st Earl of Effingham. They were the parents of:

 Hon. Francis Henry Baring (1850–1915), who married Lady Grace Boyle, daughter of Richard Boyle, 9th Earl of Cork.

Lord Northbrook died on 6 September 1866, aged 70, and was succeeded by his son from his first marriage, Thomas, who later was created Earl of Northbrook in 1876. Lady Northbrook died in December 1884, aged 75.

Honours
 Baring Bay on western Devon Island in the Canadian Arctic is named in his honour.

References

External links
 

1796 births
1866 deaths
People educated at Eton College
Alumni of Christ Church, Oxford
Barons in the Peerage of the United Kingdom
Chancellors of the Exchequer of the United Kingdom
Baring, Francis
Lords of the Admiralty
Financial Secretary to the Treasury
Members of the Privy Council of the United Kingdom
Baring, Francis
Baring, Francis
Baring, Francis
Baring, Francis
Baring, Francis
Baring, Francis
Baring, Francis
Baring, Francis
Baring, Francis
Baring, Francis
Baring, Francis
UK MPs who were granted peerages
Baring, Francis
Francis
Fellows of the Royal Society
Members of the Canterbury Association
Peers of the United Kingdom created by Queen Victoria